is a district located in Gifu Prefecture, Japan.

As of July 2011, the district has an estimated population of 31,058. The total area is 195.52 km2.

Towns and villages
Yōrō

Merger
On March 27, 2006, the town of Kamiishizu, along with the town of Sunomata from Anpachi District, merged into the city of Ōgaki.

Notes

 
Districts in Gifu Prefecture